The following is a list of films produced by the Bollywood film industry based in Mumbai in 1970:

Top-grossing films 
The top-grossing films at the Indian Box Office in
1970:

A-Z

References

External links 
 Bollywood films of 1970 at the Internet Movie Database
 Indian Film Songs from the Year 1970 – A look back at 1970 with a focus on the Hindi film song
1970 old Hindi songs list – all Bollywood songs list in 1970

1970
Bollywood
Films, Bollywood